Cuarteto Latinoamericano is one of the world's most renowned string quartets and, for forty years, the leading proponent of Latin American music for the genre. Founded in Mexico in 1982, the Cuarteto has toured extensively throughout Europe, North and South America, Israel, China, Japan, and New Zealand. They have premiered over a hundred works written for them, and they continue to introduce new and neglected composers to the genre. Winners of two Latin Grammy Award for Best Classical Album, they have also been awarded the prestigious Diapason d'Or, have been recognized with the Mexican Music Critics Association Award, and have received three "Most Adventurous Programming" Awards from Chamber Music America/ASCAP.

Cuarteto Latinoamericano's members are three Bitrán brothers: violinists Saul and Aron and cellist Alvaro, with violist Javier Montiel. They have recorded more than 100 CDs, including nearly the entire Latin American repertoire for the string quartet. Volume 6 of their Villa-Lobos cycle of 17 string quartets on Dorian was nominated for a Grammy Award and a Latin Grammy for Best Chamber Music Recording. Their albums Brasileiro, works of Mignone (2012), and El Hilo Invisible (2016) won Latin Grammy Awards for Best Classical Album. The work Inca Dances by Gabriela Lena Frank, recorded by Cuarteto Latinoamericano with Manuel Barrueco, won the 2009 Latin Grammy for Best New Latin Composition.

Formed in Mexico in 1981, Cuarteto Latinoamericano was, from 1987 until 2008, quartet-in-residence at Carnegie Mellon University in Pittsburgh. They have collaborated with many artists, including cellists János Starker and Yehuda Hanani, pianists Santiago Rodriguez, Cyprien Katsaris, Itamar Golan, and Rudolf Buchbinder, tenor Ramón Vargas, and guitarists Narciso Yepes, Sharon Isbin, David Tanenbaum and Manuel Barrueco. With Barrueco, they have played in some of the most important venues of the US and Europe, have recorded two CDs, and commissioned guitar quintets from American composers Michael Daugherty and Gabriela Lena Frank. 

Under the auspices of the Sistema Nacional de Orquestas Juveniles of Venezuela, the Cuarteto created the Latin American Academy for String Quartets, based in Caracas, which was active between 2008 and 2014. The Academy served as a training ground for five select young string quartets from the Sistema, groups which went on to lead active international careers.  The Cuarteto Latinoamericano is represented in the United States by Tom Gallant at General Arts Touring.  In the Benelux countries, their agent is Martijn Jacobus, at Impulse Arts Management, and in Italy, Cuarteto Latinoamericano is represented by Valerio Novara.

Between 2004 and 2021 they were recipients of the México en Escena grants given by the Mexican government through FONCA (National Fund for Culture and the Arts).

Recordings

Cuarteto Latinoamericano has recorded over 100 CDs, which include the complete works for quartet by Heitor Villa-Lobos, Silvestre Revueltas, Alberto Ginastera, Rodolfo Halffter, Carlos Chávez, Manuel M. Ponce, Mario Lavista, Francisco Mignone, Julián Orbón, Ruperto Chapí and many other Latin American and Spanish composers. Their sixth and final album of Heitor Villa-Lobos's string quartets, Quartets Nos. 4, 9, and 11, was nominated for two Grammy Awards (Best Chamber Music and Best Latin Music) in 2002. For Élan Recordings, they have recorded Ginastera: The Three String Quartets and Latin American String Quartets, which includes the world premiere recordings of Orbón's String Quartet and Lavista's Reflejos de la Noche. As of 2011, the Cuarteto Latinoamericano is under a recording agreement with Sono Luminus, for whom they have released five albums: Encores (2010),  Mexican Romantic Quartets (2011), Brasileiro: Works of Mignone (2012), which won a Latin Grammy Award for Best Classical Album, Ruperto Chapí: String Quartets Vol. 1 (2014) and  Ruperto Chapí: String Quartets Vol. 2 (2021). Volume 1 was nominated for a Latin Grammy in 2015.
Their 2015 album El Hilo Invisible, with Mexican singer Jaramar, won the 2016 Latin Grammy Award for Best Classical Album.

Members
Saúl Bitrán – violin I,
Arón Bitrán – violin II,
Javier Montiel – viola,
Alvaro Bitrán – cello

References

External links
Official site
Concert calendar
Cuarteto Latinoamericano on Dorian Sono Luminus Records
 Interview with guitarist Manuel Barrueco about working with Cuarteto Latinoamericano
Art of the States: Cuarteto Latinoamericano performing Memorias Tropicales (1985) by Roberto Sierra

Mexican musical groups
String quartets
Musical groups established in 1981
Carnegie Mellon University
1981 establishments in Mexico
Latin Grammy Award winners